Hatun Wayq'u (Quechua hatun big, wayq'u brook or valley, "big brook (or valley)", hispanicized spellings Hatunhuaico, Jatunhuayco) which downstream successively is named T'uruyunka (Toroyunca) and Chuqisayra (Choquesayra) is a river in Peru. It is located in the Cusco Region, La Convención Province, Vilcabamba District. It belongs to the watershed of the Apurímac River, the source of the Amazon River.

Its direction is mainly to the northwest. It receives waters from a stream named Ñañu Wayq'u ("thin brook"), a left tributary which originates north of a mountain named Ñañu Wayq'u, and from another stream which is also named Hatun Wayq'u or Qullaqucha brook (Collacocha), later called T'utura (Totora), as a left affluent.

This westernmore stream, Hatun Wayq'u or Qullaqucha, originates northeast of P'anta near . One of its left affluents is Chawpi Wayq'u ("central brook", Chaupehuaico), also known as Muñaqucha brook (Muñacocha) which originates north of Asulqucha.

Hatun Wayq'u is a right tributary of the Apurímac River. On its way it flows along Parquy, a little populated place, and  Parquyqucha ("irrigation lake"). The peaks of P'anta, Asulqucha, Chuqisapra and Sut'uq Mach'ay successively appear on the left side. The confluence with the Apurímac River is on the border of the Ayacucho Region, La Mar Province, Chungui District, and the Vilcabamba District.

References

Rivers of Peru
Rivers of Cusco Region